Raja Rajeshwari Nagar may refer to:

 Rajarajeshwari Nagar, Bangalore
 Raja Rajeshwari Nagar, Mysore